Klubina is a village and municipality in Čadca District in the Žilina Region of northern Slovakia.

History
In historical records the village was first mentioned in 1662.

Geography
The municipality lies at an altitude of 450 metres and covers an area of 15.574 km². It has a population of about 516 people.

Genealogical resources

The records for genealogical research are available at the state archive "Statny Archiv in Bytca, Slovakia"

 Roman Catholic church records (births/marriages/deaths): 1689-1907 (parish B)

See also
 List of municipalities and towns in Slovakia

External links
https://web.archive.org/web/20071006173841/http://www.statistics.sk/mosmis/eng/run.html
Surnames of living people in Klubina

Villages and municipalities in Čadca District